Funky Butt is a Norwegian jazz band inspired by New Orleans Jazz. About their music it is said it is a funky brass band with piano added, offering New Orleans music with a Nordic perspective. It is a melting pot of traditional jazz, Caribbean influences, tango, hard bop, and contemporary grooves. It embraces lyrical beauty and fresh phrasing. It involves strong soloing and respectful collective playing.

Personnel 

Vidar Sæther – saxophone
Kåre Nymark – trumpet
Even Kruse Skatrud – trombone
David Gald – tuba
Anders Aarum – piano
Knut Lothe – drums

Discography 
2001: Whoopin'  (Sonor)
2002: The Glove (Sonor)
2005: Big Mama (Schmell)
2007: Shakin' da butt (Schmell)

References

External links 

Norwegian jazz ensembles
Musical groups established in 2000
Musical groups from Oslo